"Small Bump" is a song by English singer-songwriter Ed Sheeran, released as the fifth single from his debut studio album, +. The song was written by Sheeran and produced by Jake Gosling. The single peaked at number 25 on the UK Singles Chart. The song was released to radio as the sixth and final single in Australia, where "Give Me Love" was released as the fifth single.

Background
On 26 March 2012, Sheeran announced on Twitter that "Small Bump" would be released as the fifth single from his debut album + saying "Before it gets out there, I'd like to be the first one to announce what the fifth single taken from my album '+' is." He added: "So the single is.... Small Bump." The song is written in the key of B-flat major. The song is about Sheeran's "close friend" and laments a stillbirth five months into the pregnancy. It is sung from a first-person perspective. A remix by Asa & Stumbleine was due to feature on the EP but was never finished.

Irish abortion referendum
In the run-up to the 2018 Irish Abortion referendum, a campaign against abortion rights, used "Small Bump" without Sheeran's permission. On 19 May 2018, he wrote on Instagram: "I've been informed that my song Small Bump is being used to promote the anti-abortion campaign, and I feel it's important to let you know I have not given approval for this use, and it does not reflect what the song is about."

Track listing

Charts

Weekly charts

Year-end charts

Certifications

!scope="col" colspan="3"|Streaming
|-

References

External links
 

2012 singles
Ed Sheeran songs
Song recordings produced by Jake Gosling
Songs written by Ed Sheeran
Warner Music Group singles
Songs about pregnancy